D4 motorway may refer to:

 D4 motorway (Slovakia)
 D4 motorway (Czech Republic)